Kyam Joseph Maher is an Australian politician and lawyer who has been Attorney-General of South Australia and the Leader of the Government in the Legislative Council since March 2022. He was appointed to a casual vacancy in the South Australian Legislative Council for the South Australian Branch of the Australian Labor Party on 17 October 2012. He previously served in the Cabinet of South Australia between 2015 and 2018 and was the Leader of the Government in the Legislative Council between 2016 and 2018.

Background
Maher is of Aboriginal Tasmanian descent. He grew up in Mount Gambier and attended Grant High School there. He does not consider that he experienced the disadvantage and racism that is common for many Aboriginal people in Australia. He left Mount Gambier to study law and economics at the University of Adelaide.

Maher was a lawyer and political staffer before becoming South Australian state secretary of the Australian Labor Party. In 2006, Maher was an inaugural committee member of the Progressive Labour Education Association Inc (PLEA), a joint-venture training organisation operated by the ALP Socialist Left faction and aligned unions United Voice (then the Liquor Hospitality and Miscellaneous Union) and the Australian Services Union.

Political career
Maher was appointed to the South Australian Legislative Council in 2012 to replace outgoing MLC Bob Sneath. Maher was re-elected from fourth position on the Labor ticket at the 2014 election.

In February 2015 he was appointed to cabinet and, between 2015 and the 2018 state election, Maher has served as minister in the Labor Weatherill Ministry in a range of portfolios including manufacturing and innovation, automotive transformation, Aboriginal affairs and reconciliation; and employment and science and information economy. Maher was the first Aboriginal South Australian Minister for Aboriginal Affairs.

On 18 January 2016 Maher was appointed as the Leader of the Government in the Legislative Council in the Weatherill government.

After Labor won government at the 2022 state election, Maher was appointed Attorney-General in the Malinauskas ministry on 24 March, as well as Minister for Aboriginal Affairs and Minister for Industrial Relations and Public Sector. He also became Leader of the Government in the Legislative Council for the second time. Maher was the first initiated Aboriginal man in the nation's history to be appointed in the Attorney-General position.

References

External links

Parliamentary Profile: SA Labor website

Living people
Members of the South Australian Legislative Council
Place of birth missing (living people)
Year of birth missing (living people)
21st-century Australian lawyers
Australian Labor Party members of the Parliament of South Australia
Labor Left politicians
21st-century Australian politicians
Indigenous Australian politicians